Exu, ExU or EXU may refer to:

 Exu, Pernambuco, a city in Brazil
 Exú, a Yoruba divinity
 Exu Formation, a Mesozoic geologic formation in Brazil
 Exu, a character in the 2013 Brazilian drama film, Riocorrente
 Exu, a type of spirit in Afro-Brazilian Quimbanda
 EXU, the execute instruction on the SDS 9 series
 Empress Lü (241–180 BC), courtesy name Exu
 Exandria Unlimited (ExU), an anthology web series set in the Critical Role universe